Patch of Land is a peer-to-peer real estate crowdfunding online marketplace and hard money loan provider that connects real estate developers needing financing to lenders and real estate investors. Patch of Land focuses on 6–24 months real-estate first lien mortgage loans with borrower guarantees.

History
Patch of Land was established by Jason Fritton, Brian Fritton and Carlo Tabibi in 2012 in Los Angeles, California. Jason Fritton was among those who lobbied the United States Congress for the inclusion of real-estate crowdfunding in the JOBS Act. 

The company hired AdaPia d'Errico as Chief Marketing Officer and Amy Wan as its General Legal Counsel.

In August 2015, Patch of Land announced its Indentured Trustee Investment Model, offering a bankruptcy remote investment structure and stronger consumer protections for its investors. Patch of Land opened its Indentured Trustee Model documentation to the public in the hopes that other firms would follow suit, as many did.

In 2015, CNBC created its Crowdfunding Index, powered by Crowdnetic, and included Patch of Land in both the real estate sub-sector as well as the overarching crowdfinancing sector

In 2015, Entrepreneur named Patch of Land to its list of 100 Brilliant Companies.

In April 2016, the company hired Paul Deitch from Oaktree Capital Management as CEO. He resigned in November 2017 and was replaced by co-founder and chairman Jason Fritton.

See also
 Crowdsourcing
 Peer-to-peer lending
 Peer-to-peer banking
 Comparison of crowdfunding services
 Disruptive innovation
 Crowdfunding (Real Estate)
 Non-bank financial institution
 Prosper Marketplace
 Hard money loan
 Bridge Loans (Real Estate)

References

External links
 

American real estate websites
Online marketplaces of the United States